Joe Pearce (birth unknown – death unknown), also known by the nickname of "Sandy", was a professional rugby league footballer who played in the 1920s and 1930s.

Playing career
Joe Pearce made his début for Wakefield Trinity during April 1925, he appears to have scored no drop-goals (or field-goals as they are currently known in Australasia), but prior to the 1974–75 season all goals, whether; conversions, penalties, or drop-goals, scored 2-points, consequently prior to this date drop-goals were often not explicitly documented, therefore '0' drop-goals may indicate drop-goals not recorded, rather than no drop-goals scored. In addition, prior to the 1949–50 season, the archaic field-goal was also still a valid means of scoring points.

County Cup Final appearances
Joe Pearce played  in Wakefield Trinity's 3–10 defeat by Huddersfield in the 1926 Yorkshire County Cup Final during the 1926–27 season at Headingley, Rugby Stadium, Leeds on Wednesday 1 December 1926, and played  in the 0–8 defeat by Leeds in the 1932 Yorkshire County Cup Final during the 1932–33 season at Fartown Ground, Huddersfield on Saturday 19 November 1932.

Notable tour matches
Joe Pearce played , i.e. number 5, in Wakefield Trinity's 6-17 defeat by Australia in the 1933–34 Kangaroo tour of Great Britain match during the 1933–34 season at Belle Vue, Wakefield on Saturday 28 October 1933.

References

External links
Search for "Pearce" at rugbyleagueproject.org

Place of birth missing
Place of death missing
Rugby league five-eighths
English rugby league players
Rugby league wingers
Wakefield Trinity players
Year of birth missing
Year of death missing